Pankaj Dheer is an Indian actor who appears in Hindi films and TV series. He is known for his role of Karna in TV series Mahabharat and other roles in Chandrakanta, The Great Maratha, Yug and Badho Bahu. He appeared in several Hindi films in small roles, including Sadak, Soldier and Baadshah.

Personal life 
Dheer has a son, Nikitin Dheer, who is also an actor. Niktin married Kratika Sengar.

Career
In 1988, Dheer played the role of Karna in B. R. Chopra's epic television series Mahabharat. He was popularised after playing Karna. His pictures were used in textbooks as reference to Karna and his statues are worshipped as Karna in temples in Karnal and Bastar.

He appeared at the lead in debut episode Dastak, TV series, Zee Horror Show (1993), along with Archana Puran Singh. He also played the lead as a defence lawyer in the TV Series Kanoon, a series based on court-room dramas.

In 2006 Dheer established a shooting studio, Visage Studioz along with his brother Satluj Dheer at Jogeshwari, Mumbai. In 2010, he opened Abbhinnay Acting Academy in Mumbai, with actor Gufi Paintal as the faculty head.

Filmography

As director

As actor

References

External links
 

Indian male television actors
Male actors in Hindi cinema
Living people
Place of birth missing (living people)
Indian male soap opera actors
20th-century Indian male actors
21st-century Indian male actors
Male actors in Malayalam cinema
Indian male film actors
Year of birth missing (living people)